Ishu is a 2017 Assamese language feature film written and directed by Utpal Borpujari, a film critic and former journalist. Produced by Children's Film Society, India (CFSI), the film is inspired by a novel written by Assamese writer Manikuntala Bhattacharya. Set in a remote village in Goalpara district, Ishu stars Kapil Garo as the titular character, along with Bishnu Khargharia and Tonthoingambi Leishangthem Devi. In 2018, the film was awarded the National Film Award for Best Feature Film in Assamese at the 65th National Film Awards. The film also won the Best Film title at the third Sailadhar Baruah Film Awards in Assam.

Casting 
Kapil is a ten-year-old school going boy from a village in Assam. He was chosen by Borpujari from 300-odd children for the role. Its casts also include Bishnu Khargoria, Leishangthem Devi, and Chetana Das among others.

Shooting 
The film was shot in and around Rampur, a town in Kamrup rural district of Assam.

Screening 
The film has been screened at various film festivals across the globe. In April 2022 the film has been selected to screen at EIIFF.

References

External links 
 

Assamese-language films
Best Assamese Feature Film National Film Award winners